The Equestrian competition at the 2006 Central American and Caribbean Games was held in Cartagena, Colombia.

Medal summary

Individual events

Team events

References

External links
Official Results

Equestrian at the Central American and Caribbean Games
2006 in equestrian
Equestrian sports in Colombia
2006 Central American and Caribbean Games
Equestrian sports competitions in Colombia